Dan Coleman may refer to:

Dan Coleman (composer) (born 1972), composer and music publisher
Dan Coleman (basketball) (born 1985), American basketball player
Daniel Coleman (born 1984), Ghanaian footballer
Daniel Coleman (Alabama judge) (1801–1857), Justice of the Supreme Court of Alabama